Leukemia, acute lymphocytic, susceptibility to, 1 is a protein that in humans is encoded by the ALL1 gene.

References